Chelonoidis monensis, also known as the Mona tortoise, is an extinct species of land tortoise that lived on  the island of Mona from the Late Pleistocene to around 1000 BCE. Evidence for the latter date includes cave drawings. All fossil remains have been found either in or near Liro Cave on the east side of Mona. It had a carapace length of around 50cm.

Reference 

monensis
Reptiles described in 1952
Extinct turtles
Holocene extinctions